is a town located in Yōrō District, Gifu Prefecture, Japan. , the town had an estimated population of 29,309 in 10,356 households and a population density of 405 persons per km2.

Geography
Yōrō is located in south-west Gifu Prefecture, with the Yōrō Mountains to the west and the plains of the Ibi River to the east, The Makita River also flows through the town. The town has a climate characterized by characterized by hot and humid summers, and mild winters  (Köppen climate classification Cfa).  The average annual temperature in Yōrō is 15.3 °C. The average annual rainfall is 1840 mm with September as the wettest month. The temperatures are highest on average in August, at around 27.6 °C, and lowest in January, at around 4.1 °C.

Neighbouring municipalities
Gifu Prefecture
Ōgaki
Kaizu
Tarui
Wanouchi
Mie Prefecture
Inabe

Demographics
Per Japanese census data, the population of Yōrō peaked around the year 2000 and has declined since.

History
The area around Yōrō was part of traditional Mino Province.  With the post-Meiji restoration cadastral reforms, the town of Yōrō was established on April 1, 1897. Yōrō merged with the town of Takeda and villages of Hirohata, Kamitado, Ikebe, Kasago, Kobata, Tado, Hiyoshi and Aihara in 1954 to form the town of Yōrō. A referendum to merge into the city of Ōgaki was defeated in 2004.

Education
Yōrō has four public elementary schools and two public junior high schools operated by the town government, and one public high school operated by the Gifu Prefectural Board of Education.

Transportation

Railway 
 Yōrō Railway Yōrō Line
  -   -

Highway
  Meishin Expressway
  Tōkai-Kanjō Expressway

Sister city relations
 - Bad Soden, Hessen, Germany, since February 2004

Local attractions
 Mount Yōrō
 Yōrō Falls
 Kikusui-Sen spring
 Yōrō Temple
 Reversible Destiny-Yoro Park is a theme park in Yōrō described as "an 'experience park' conceived on the theme of encountering the unexpected. By guiding visitors through various unexpected experiences as they walk through its component areas, the Site offers them opportunities to rethink their physical and spiritual orientation to the world." The park was opened in October 1995. Designed by Shusaku Arakawa and Madeline Gins.
 Tōkai Nature Trail

Local legends
A local woodcutter discovered a stream that ran with fine sake. He filled a gourd and brought the liquid to his father. Drinking the liquid made his father feel youthful and turned his hair from gray to black. Empress Gensho of Nara visited Yōrō to try the liquid and it made her youthful, too.
There is a persimmon tree that grows hair on the grounds of Fukugen-ji temple, because a murder victim is buried beneath the tree.

References

Gallery

External links

 Yoro official website 
 "Color Yoro World" by Steven Kenworthy

 
Towns in Gifu Prefecture
Yōrō District, Gifu